Hubert Johnson may refer to:

Hubert Johnson (musician) (1941–1981), performer with The Contours
Laurie Johnson (cricketer) (born 1927), West Indies born cricketer

See also
Bert Johnson (disambiguation)
Hubert Johnston (disambiguation)